In English law (and other countries which adopt the rule), the cab-rank rule is the obligation of a barrister to accept any work in a field in which they profess themselves competent to practise, at a court at which they normally appear, and at their usual rates. The rule derives its name from the tradition by which a hackney carriage driver at the head of a queue of taxicabs is obliged to take the first passenger requesting a ride.

The cab rank rule is set out at rC29 of the Bar Standards Board Handbook. It states that if the barrister receives instructions from a professional client and the instructions are appropriate taking into account their experience, seniority and/or field of practice, they must (subject to the
exceptions in rC30) accept those instructions irrespective of:
 The identity of the client;
 The nature of the case to which the instructions relate;
 Whether the client is paying privately or is publicly funded; and
 Any belief or opinion which you may have formed as to the character, reputation, cause, conduct, guilt or innocence of the client.

Without the cab-rank rule, an unpopular person might not get legal representation; barristers who acted for them might be criticised for doing so.

Addressing the continued necessity for the rule in 2010, the Law Society of England and Wales, which represents solicitors, together with The Bar Council said:

See also
 Hobson's choice

References

Legal ethics
English legal terminology